Kamyanyets or Kamenets is a town in Brest Region, Belarus, and the administrative center of Kamenets District. The town is located in the northwestern corner of Brest Region on the Lyasnaya river, about 40 km north from Brest. In 2002, the population was about 9,000 people. The Leśna Prawa river flows through the town.

History

It was first mentioned in the Halych-Volhynian Chronicle in 1276, when a castle with a keep, the tower of Kamyenyets, was being constructed on this spot, to protect the northern boundary of Volhynia from the raids of invaders. This site on the stony steep bank of the Liasnaja (Lysna or Leśna) River had attracted Oleksa, the prominent builder and architect of Volhynia. He showed the site to Vladimir Vasilkovich, the Prince of Volhynia, who appreciated the place and ordered Oleksa to build a castle with a keep on the spot. Later a town appeared around the fortification. The tower is often called Bielaja Vieža (alternative transliteration: Belaya Vezha), which means White Tower or White Fortress in Belarusian, because after its foundation it was tiled in white. The neighboring primeval forest of Belavezhskaya Pushcha received its name, which also means White Tower, through association with the tower. However, today the color of the castle is brick-red, having weathered through the ages, not white.

The original name of the town comes from the Slavic word kamennyj  which means stony in English, as it was founded atop a stony rise.

In 1366, it was incorporated into the Grand Duchy of Lithuania and in 1376 it was burnt by Teutonic Crusaders but rapidly rebuilt. In 1503, local townsfolk received a limited self-administration right (probably the Magdeburg Rights) that was used by 1795, when it was annexed by Russia. In 1588 and 1659, the town was devastated with plague.

In the 19th century and the first four decades of the 20th century, the local Jewish community was the most active part of the townsfolk. Memories of the town are included in Yechezkel Kotik's memoir, published in English as Journey To a Nineteenth Century Shtetl: The Memoirs of Yekhezkel Kotik. Yeshivas Knesses Beis Yitzchak-Kaminetz was there 1926-1939.

In the years 1921-1939 it was in Poland. In 1939, it was occupied by Soviet Union and annexed to the Belorussian SSR. From 23 June 1941 until 22 July 1944, Kamyenyets was occupied by Nazi Germany and administered as a part of Bezirk Bialystok. During the Nazi occupation, most local Jews were killed.

After World War II, the town developed as a minor center of the food processing industry (cheese and butter making, baking of bread, etc.).

Attractions
The main historical attraction is the donjon that accommodates a museum. There are also St Simeon's Orthodox church (1914); Sts Peter and Paul Roman Catholic church (1925) and Roman Catholic cemetery of the 18th - early 20th centuries. The building of a synagogue (used until 1941). Since 2009, there has been an annual historical Belaja Vezha Festival organized by local people.

References

External links

 Kamenets - Belarus at its BEST!
 Kamenets Tower 
 Photos on Radzima.org
 Kamenets website
 

Populated places in Brest Region
Kamenets District
Towns in Belarus
Brest Litovsk Voivodeship
Brestsky Uyezd
Polesie Voivodeship
Holocaust locations in Belarus

kk:Каменец (Плевен облысы)